2-Aminopurine, a purine analog of guanine and adenine, is a fluorescent molecular marker used in nucleic acid research.  It most commonly pairs with thymine as an adenine-analogue, but can also pair with cytosine as a guanine-analogue;.  For this reason it is sometimes used in the laboratory for mutagenesis.

See also
Nucleic acid analogues

References 

Nucleobases
Purines